Banitsa (Bulgarian & Macedonian: баница), also transliterated as banica and banitza, is a traditional pastry dish made in Bulgaria, North Macedonia and Southeastern Serbia (where it may also be referred to as gibanica), prepared by layering a mixture of whisked eggs, natural yogurt and pieces of white brined cheese between filo pastry and then baking it in an oven.

Traditionally, lucky charms are put into the pastry on certain occasions, particularly on  New Year's Eve. These charms may be coins or small symbolic objects (e.g., a small piece of a dogwood branch with a bud, symbolizing health or longevity). More recently, people have started writing happy wishes on small pieces of paper and wrapping them in tin foil. Wishes may include happiness, health, or success throughout the new year (similar to fortune cookies).

Banitsa is served for breakfast with plain yogurt, ayran, or boza. It can be eaten hot or cold. Some varieties include banitsa with spinach "спаначник" or the sweet version, banitsa with milk "млечна баница" or pumpkin "тиквеник".

Etymology 
The word баница derives from the South Slavic гъбнѫти meaning "to fold."  The word developed from the Proto-Slavic form *гыбаница > *гъбаница > *гбаница > баница.

Recipes

Dough
Traditionally, banitsa is made with homemade or commercially made pastry sheets that are prepared from a baker's hard dough made of flour, water, and salt. At home the sheets can be spread by continuously pulling the sheet of dough with one's fingers until it becomes less than a millimeter thin, or by using a rolling pin in several stages with sunflower oil  sprinkled between the partially spread leaves, or by a very difficult technique comprising waving movements of the entire sheet over the head of the cook, which resembles pizza dough making techniques. Commercially available sheets are mechanically spread and somewhat dried before packing.

The usual filling is cheese.

Filling

The traditional filling is made of crushed white cheese (sirene, feta cheese), yogurt, and eggs. Sometimes baking soda is added to the yogurt, which makes it rise (as the baking soda reacts with the acid in yogurt). The addition of baking soda results in a fluffier filling.

Vegetable fillings include spinach, sorrel, docks, mangold, chards, beet leaves, nettles, leaves of the radishes, leeks, onions and green part of spring onions, parsley, cabbage or sauerkraut. All these variants, including cabbage, are called  (зелник), from the word зелен 'green'. The leek variant is called  (празник) and onion variant is called  (лучник).

In some regions of Bulgaria, the filling is made with rice. There are also meat fillings with minced meat, onions, and mushrooms. Sweet fillings with apples (similar to apple pie or strudel) or pumpkin with sugar, walnuts and cinnamon exist as well. In some regions, only the walnuts, sugar, and cinnamon are used.

Modern take on Banitsa with milk is made by baking the leaves soaked in milk with sugar, eggs and vanilla.

Preparation
In a large greased baking dish, individual sheets are layered one by one with small amounts of filling and sunflower oil or/and melted butter between them. After half of the sheets are placed in the pan, a large portion of the filling is spooned onto the leaves and is then covered with the remaining sheets and filling in the same manner. The pastry is then baked at 200–250 °C. In some recipes, just before the banitsa is finished, a glass of lemonade or sparkling water is poured into the tray, and the baking continues for several more minutes.

An alternative method of preparation is taking each sheet of dough, laying it out flat, and sprinkling some of the fillings on it. Then, the sheet is rolled up into a tight roll with the filling on the inside of the roll. The long roll is then taken and rolled up in a circle. This first sheet of dough is then placed in the baking pan. The process is repeated with the remaining sheets of dough and each consecutive roll is placed around the first one in the pan. The resulting shape resembles a spiral (see photo). The banitsa is then sprinkled with sunflower oil or melted butter and baked.

Symbolism
In Bulgaria, banitsa is a symbol of Bulgarian cuisine and traditions.

Traditionally, Bulgarians prepare and serve banitsa on two holidays – Christmas and New Year's Eve. On these days, people add  (literally lucks, meaning fortunes, lucky charms) into the banitsa. The charms are usually small pieces of dogwood branch, which vary in numbers of buds on them. They symbolize health and longevity. The branches are hidden inside the banitsa, and the banitsa is then baked. When ready, the banitsa is cut to as many pieces as the members of the family are and each piece contains a dogwood branch. Two additional pieces of banitsa are cut - one for the house and another one for Virgin Mary who is the protector of the family. A wish is associated with each branch and the different number of buds on the branch helps to recognize the corresponding wish. The wishes include happiness, health, success, travel, etc. The banitsa is then spun on the table and everyone takes the piece which is in front of them when the spinning stops. Then they find their fortune inside the piece – the fortunes predict what one is to expect from the new year. The most common fortunes are "health", "love", "marriage", "baby", "journey", "wealth", etc.

In this case, they are wrapped in tin foil to preserve them during baking.

The word "banitsa" is used as a simile for something (mainly documents and paperwork) creased, or badly maintained. For example, a police officer can make a remark to someone about letting his or her passport "become like a banitsa" (станал е на баница); a teacher might say this about a pupil's notebook.
The same can be said about a very badly crushed car after an accident.

See also

 List of pastries

References

External links

Ralitsa's Famous Banitsa
Banitsa online
Longing for the Lingering Bulgarian Meal (banitsa recipe)

Bulgarian pastries
Cheese dishes
Egg dishes